The 1995–96 Danish Superliga season was the 6th season of the Danish Superliga league championship, governed by the Danish Football Association.

The Danish champions qualified for the UEFA Champions League 1996-97 qualification, while the second and third placed teams qualified for the qualification round of the UEFA Cup 1996-97. The fourth, fifth and sixth placed teams qualified for the UEFA Intertoto Cup 1996, while the two lowest placed teams of the tournament was directly relegated to the Danish 1st Division. Likewise, the Danish 1st Division champions and runners-up were promoted to the Superliga. However, the 1st, the 3rd, the 4th, and the 6th played the UEFA Cup after the preliminary rounds.

Table

Results

Top goal scorers

See also
 1995-96 in Danish football

External links
  Peders Fodboldstatistik

Danish Superliga seasons
1995–96 in Danish football
Denmark